Przykona  is a village in Turek County, Greater Poland Voivodeship, in west-central Poland. It is the seat of the gmina (administrative district) called Gmina Przykona.

The village has a population of 520.

References

Przykona